Igor Henrique de Souza Rocha (born 21 September 1995) is a Brazilian professional footballer who plays as a forward for Maltese side Żebbuġ Rangers on loan from St. Lucia.

Club career
Rocha initially joined Benfica on trial in 2016, featuring in a handful of friendlies and scoring in an 8–0 win over U.D. Vilafranquense. He signed a professional contract but would have to wait until April 2017 to make his debut due to a rupture of the anterior cruciate ligament in his right knee. His debut came in a Benfica B 2–1 victory over Porto B.

Career statistics

Club

Notes

References

External links
 

1995 births
Living people
Brazilian footballers
Brazilian expatriate footballers
Association football forwards
S.L. Benfica B players
Liga Portugal 2 players
Brazilian expatriate sportspeople in Portugal
Expatriate footballers in Portugal
Brazilian expatriate sportspeople in Malta
Expatriate footballers in Malta
Sportspeople from Campinas